Dawood Olad Al-Seyed (in Arabic  : داوود اولاد السيد ), was born on April 14, 1953, in Marrakech, Morocco. He is a Moroccan director, screenwriter, and photographer.

References

1953 births
Living people
People from Marrakesh
Moroccan screenwriters